Lok Insaaf Party was founded in 2016 by Simarjit Singh Bains.

It contested 2017 Punjab Legislative Assembly election on 5 seats in alliance with Aam Aadmi Party.

2017 Punjab assembly election
LIP contested 2017 Punjab assembly election on 5 seats. It formed coalition with Aam Aadmi Party. Party able to get only 2 seats out of 5. It got 26.46% votes in 5 seats but 1.22% overall votes. Simarjit Singh Bains won Atam Nagar Assembly Constituency and Balwinder Singh Bains won the Ludhiana South Assembly Constituency.

2019 general election 
In 2019 Indian general election party contested on 3 Lok Sabha seats in Punjab as a member of Punjab Democratic Alliance but couldn't win any. Which were as follow :-
Sangrur
Ludhiana
Fatehgarh Sahib

References 

Political parties established in 2016
Political parties in Punjab, India
2016 establishments in Punjab, India